The 2013–14 New Zealand V8 season was the fifteenth season of the series, under the NZV8 guise. The season began at the Thunder in the Park event at Pukekohe Park Raceway on 16 November 2013 and finished at the Pukekohe Park Raceway ITM Auckland 400 V8 Supercars event on 27 April after six championship meetings. Jason Bargwanna was the reigning TLX champion, and whilst AJ Lauder won the TL Championship, graduated into the TLX class to battle for the title. The TLX Championship eventually was won by Nick Ross and the TL Championship was won by Ian Booth.

Teams and drivers

 Changes from 2013

 Championship Winning Team Tulloch Motorsport will not be returning this season.
 TLX Championship winning driver Jason Bargwanna moves from Tulloch Motorsport to Richards Team Motorsport.
 TL Championship winning driver AJ Lauder moves from Team Aegis Racing in the TL class to Richards Team Motorsport in the TLX Class.
 Martin Short and Brett Collins from Richards Team Motorsport both will not be returning in 2013.
 No Fea Racing Team buys Tulloch Motorsports Holden Commodore (VE) with Lance Hughes driving.
 Haydn Mackenzie Motorsport will not be returning in 2013–14, neither will Haydn Mackenzie as a driver.
 Haydn Mackenzie Motorsport sold their Ford Falcon (FG) to Varney Motorsport for Shaun Varney to drive.
 Ethan Coleman Motorsport to enter sometime during the 2013–14 season.

There are multiple changes within the TL class, with many new drivers that will make the class extremely competitive.

Calendar

Championship standings

References

External links
 

V8
V8
NZ Touring Cars Championship seasons